Dana Guzmán (born 22 March 2003) is a Peruvian tennis player.

Guzmán has a career high ITF junior ranking of 11, achieved on 4 January 2021.

Guzmán represents Peru in the Fed Cup.

References

External links
 
 
 
 

2003 births
Living people
Peruvian female tennis players
People from Piura
Tennis players at the 2019 Pan American Games
Pan American Games competitors for Peru
21st-century Peruvian women